Binta Diakhaté (born 10 December 1994) is a Senegalese footballer who plays as a forward. She has been a member of the Senegal women's national team.

Club career
Diakhaté has played for Lycée Ameth Fall in Senegal and for FC Metz, Metz ESAP, AS Nancy Lorraine and FF Yzeure Allier Auvergne in France.

International career
Diakhaté capped for Senegal at senior level during the 2016 Africa Women Cup of Nations qualification.

References

External links

1994 births
Living people
People from Rufisque
Senegalese women's footballers
Women's association football forwards
FC Metz (women) players
AS Nancy Lorraine players
Senegal women's international footballers
Senegalese expatriate footballers
Expatriate women's footballers in France
Senegalese expatriate sportspeople in France